Arvo Leander Lindén, later Linko (27 February 1887 – 18 March 1941) was a Finnish wrestler, who won an Olympic bronze medal in Greco-Roman wrestling in 1908.

Wrestling 

Lindén began wrestling at the age of eleven, and competitively in 1904, when he won the Häme Province lightweight championship.

He won Finnish wrestling championship in Greco-Roman under 60 kg class in 1908.

He won bronze at the 1908 Olympics, which was a single-elimination tournament:

His Olympic medal was auctioned for 3 500 euros in 2015.

He won the Russian championship twice. In 1909, it was split between him, Emil Väre and Nikolay Orlov. In 1910, he won it exclusively.

Soon after, neuropathic pain forced him to retire from wrestling.

He returned to wrestling by taking part in professional events in Port Arthur, Ontario in 1923, training and coaching at the Nahjus Athletic Club.

Diving 

He won the Finnish Workers' Sports Federation championship in plain platform jumps in 1929.

Sources

References

External links

1887 births
1941 deaths
Olympic wrestlers of Finland
Wrestlers at the 1908 Summer Olympics
Finnish male sport wrestlers
Olympic bronze medalists for Finland
Olympic medalists in wrestling
Medalists at the 1908 Summer Olympics
Sportspeople from Tampere